The 2015 Atlético Nacional season was the 68th season in the club's history. The team competed in the Categoría Primera A, Copa Colombia, Superliga Colombiana and Copa Libertadores.

Players

First-team squad

Pre-season and friendlies

Superliga Colombiana

Categoría Primera A

Torneo Finalización

†: Matches postponed due to participation in the Copa Libertadores and Copa Sudamericana.

Knockout phase

References

External links
Atlético Nacional - Official Website
Soccerway - Atlético Nacional

Atlético Nacional seasons
Colombian football club seasons